TPCA may refer to:

 The Primacy Collegiate Academy, a school in Taipei, Taiwan
 Toyota Peugeot Citroën Automobile Czech, an automobile manufacturing plant in Kolín, Czech Republic, since 2021 known as Toyota Motor Manufacturing Czech Republic